Eterusia repleta is a moth of the family Zygaenidae. It is found in Thailand and India.

The wingspan is about 78 mm.

References 

Chalcosiinae
Moths described in 1864